Lake Bolon is a large freshwater lake in the Khabarovsk Krai, Russia. It has an area of 338 km²; it is 70 km long and 20 km wide, and has a maximum depth of about 4 m. It is located on the broad west-bank flood plain of the Amur River about 80 km south of Komsomolsk and drains into the Amur by a 9 km channel. Lake Bolon is an important stopping place for migratory birds. The south end of the lake is a nature preserve.

References

Bolon
Ramsar sites in Russia